Jack Nix may refer to:
 Jack Nix (American football, born 1928), American and Canadian football end for the San Francisco 49ers and Saskatchewan Roughriders
 Jack Nix (American football, born 1917) (1917–1990), American football wing back for the Cleveland Rams